Rutana is an Arabic term applied to any of Sudan's many non-Arabic vernacular languages and often taken to be pejorative.

References

Languages of Sudan